Mic Conway (born 15 February 1951) is an Australian vocalist and with his brother, Jim Conway, was a co-founder of the 1970s humour, theatre and rock group, The Captain Matchbox Whoopee Band.

Conway also was a founding member of Soapbox Circus and Circus Oz.

Conway plays an assortment of oddball instruments, and performs magic, juggling, tap dancing and fire eating.

Biography
Conway, along with his brother Jim, attended Camberwell High School.  There they formed the Jelly Bean Jug Band which would later become The Captain Matchbox Whoopee Band.  Captain Matchbox would later find success in the 1970s where the group produced seven records, two of which reached gold status. Also in the 1970s, he joined the Pram Factory Theatre and created the Soapbox Circus with Matchbox where he served as the ringmaster, musician, juggler and acrobat. The act would become Circus Oz in 1978.

Conway was a member of the Conway Brothers Hiccups Orchestra from 1984–1988 and toured the UK in 1986 appearing at the Edinburgh Festival, the Capitol Music Festival and the Newcastle Festival. In 1988, the Conway Brothers appeared at the Houston International Festival, World Expo 88 and the Perth festival.

He reinvented himself as a children's performer in the 1990s, appearing on shows such as Humphrey B. Bear (on which he was known as 'Magic Mic'), Play School, Mr. Squiggle and ABC 4 Kids, and Conway received an ARIA (Australian Recording Industry Association) award in 1994. Conway was a regular part of The Wiggles where he provided the voice of Wags the Dog for the TV series in the 1990s and 2000s, co-wrote songs, and made appearances on various videos, including the group's feature movie.

He also has a band, Mic Conway's National Junk Band.

Awards and nominations

ARIA Music Awards

References

General
  Note: Archived [on-line] copy has limited functionality.
  Note: [on-line] version established at White Room Electronic Publishing Pty Ltd in 2007 and was expanded from the 2002 edition.

Specific

External links

 

1951 births
ARIA Award winners
Living people
Australian male singers
Australian multi-instrumentalists
Musicians from Melbourne
Australian ukulele players
Washboard players
Australian harmonica players
Australian children's musicians